Antônio Pereira da Silva (born May 25, 1957) is a former football referee from Brazil. He officiated the football tournament in the 1996 Summer Olympics in Atlanta, United States, and the 1997 Copa América.

References

External links 
 
 
 
 

1957 births
Living people
Brazilian football referees
Copa América referees
Olympic football referees